{{Infobox President 
| name=Bo Gu博古| image=Chin_Banxian.jpg
| caption=Bo Gu
| nationality=Chinese
| order=3rd General Secretary of the Central Committee of the Communist Party of China
| term_start=1932
| term_end=1935
| predecessor=Xiang Zhongfa
| successor=Zhang Wentian
| birth_date=14 May 1907
| birth_place= Wuxi, Jiangsu, Qing Dynasty 
| death_date= (aged 38)
| death_place= Republic of China 
| spouse=
| party=Chinese Communist Party
| vice_president=
|}}Qin Bangxian or Ch'in Pang-hsien, better known as Bo Gu' (Wade-Giles: Po Ku''; May 14, 1907 – April 8, 1946) was a senior leader of the Chinese Communist Party and a member of the 28 Bolsheviks.

Early life and education
Qin was born in Wuxi, Jiangsu, in 1907. In his earlier years, Qin studied at the Suzhou Industrial School where he took an active role in activities against imperialism and the warlords tyrannizing China. In 1925 Qin entered Shanghai University, a university that was known for its impact on young revolutionists at the time. The ideas of Marxism and Leninism were taught there by early leaders of the Chinese Communist party like Qu Qiubai and Deng Zhongxia. Qin showed a great interest in these teachings. Later that year, Qin joined the May 30th Movement which called for protests and boycotts against imperialism. This was a precursor to his involvement in the CPC.

In 1926 Qin was sent to the Moscow Sun Yat-sen University in Moscow, Russia where he continued to study both Marxism and Leninism. The Sun Yat-sen University was established under Kuomintang founder Sun Yat-sen's alliance policy with the Soviet Union and the CPC. Its aim was to systematically train young revolutionists for Chinese revolution in the Russian fashion. Using the alias "Bo Gu", which means "familiar with histories" in Chinese, Qin continued his studies while becoming acquainted with Wang Ming, a student who had come to the university a year earlier. Wang and Qin, along with many other students, such as Zhang Wentian, Wang Jiaxiang, and Yang Shangkun formed a group known as the 28 Bolsheviks.

They regarded themselves as orthodox Marxists, destined to take charge of Chinese revolution. Furthermore, with Wang's connection to Sun Yat-sen University's vice president and future vice minister of the Eastern Department of Comintern, Pavel Mif, the 28 Bolsheviks gained influence. One example being their role as missionaries and interpreters for the 6th National Congress of the CPC held in Moscow, with chances to comment on Chinese affairs.

Involvement with Chinese Communist Party
With Mif succeeding Radek as president, his protégés, among them Bo Gu, were sent back to take charge of CPC. 
However, because of their inexperience in relation to veteran members such as Zhou Enlai and Zhang Guotao, the group was assigned to insignificant work. Then with the direct support from Mif, who came to China as envoy of Comintern, in the 4th Plenary Meeting of 6th National Congress of CPC in 1931 Wang and his associates won the battle with Li Lisan, who was incumbent paramount leader of CPC at that time, and Li's opponents of old CPC members, such as Labor activists He Mengxiong and Lin Yuying. Wang was appointed as member of politburo of CPC, with Mif took charge of CPC headquarter, Wang became the No1 in practice. As a reward, Bo Gu was appointed to be placed in charge of CY. When Wang returned Moscow for medical treatment, Qin was promoted to become a member of the Central Bureau of CPC, and then to be the General Secretary of the Communist Party of China in charge of daily work of CPC. Under the policy of extremism and leftism of Li and Wang, CPC suffered great loss in their power struggle with KMT in cities. In 1933 Bo Gu and other members of the Central Bureau such as Zhou Enlai had to evacuate to Soviet Territory, which was the power base set up by CPC, in the countryside, in Jiangxi. Bo Gu, Zhou and Otto Braun, the military advisor from Comintern, found a military command team to replace Mao Zedong's control over the military, who was chairman of the Chinese Soviet Government at that time. Due to a change in Nationalist tactics, the CPC Red Army suffered great losses in Chiang Kai-shek's 5th Suppression against them. Bo Gu and his team had to launch a strategic diversion.

During the Long March, the Red Army suffered heavy casualties from time to time, due to no plan and incompetence of command of the three-man leadership team. Especially, when the Red Army crossed the Xiang River, the Red Army was near a rat trap, and half of its elites were annihilated by the KMT army. Discontent and fury over the three-man leadership team increased. Under these circumstances, Mao used his diplomatic skills to communicate with Wang Jiaxiang, General Commissar of Red Army at that time, and got support from most of the generals that once had been loyal to him.

Then in January 1935 came the convening of Zunyi Conference, and with the defection of 28 Bolshevik members Zhang Wentian, Wang Jiaxiang and Yang Shangkun to Mao's camp, the three-man team's command over military was discharged, Mao, Wang and Zhou Enlai composed a new three-man team to replace them, and Bo Gu's title of General Secretary was replaced by his former associate Zhang, but he remained a member of the Oolitburo.

Time in Army
When Bo Gu reached Yan'an with the Red Army, he was still a young man, longing for a bright future of Chinese revolution. In order to make a clear distinction from his past, Bo Gu preferred others called him by his real name Qin instead of his alias. Mao still needed Gu and others of the 28 Bolsheviks such as Zhang Wentian and Wang Jiaxiang for their support in Mao's later power struggle with Wang Ming and Zhang Guotao, and thus Mao gave them some important assignments from time to time. For example, Qin was appointed as representative of CPC with Zhou Enlai and Ye Jianying, and went to Xi'an to handle the Xi'an Incident in 1936, making a contribution for the establishment of United Front against Japan. In 1937 Qin was appointed as Minister of Organization Department of CPC, which was in charge of CPC cadres' promotion and nomination. In 1938 he was the Minister of Organization Department of Yangtze River and then Southern China Division of CPC. In 1941 he was appointed as head of Jie Fang Daily and Xinhua News Agency. Qin showed great enthusiasm in promoting the newspaper and exercised his best endeavor to make it a mouthpiece of CPC. Qin pledged his allegiance to Mao in Mao's struggle with Zhang Guotao, and in Cheng Feng he criticized his former close friend Wang Ming. But Qin still could not obtain favor from Mao and he had suffered greatly from stress and humiliation. His kindness and leniency towards the Cheng Feng movement by the newspaper under his direction received heavy criticism from Mao and his secret police boss Kang Sheng. They regarded Qin's action being inefficient and too merciful. As a result, although Qin was elected as Commissioner of the Central Committee of CPC in the 7th National Congress of CPC in 1945, he was listed as the last one.

After the end of World War II in 1945, Mao was invited by Chiang to Chongqing for peace negotiation in order to avoid civil war between CPC and KMT. Qin was one of the delegates of the CPC with Mao, which indicated his appealing to Mao and his prominence in the CPC. Qin attended the following Political Consulting Congress held in Chongqing as delegate of CPC in Feb 1946. When Qin was on his way back to Yan'an, he died in an airplane crash in Shanxi. Among the other victims were several senior CPC leaders such as General Ye Ting, the secret police boss Deng Fa, and the old CPC member Wang Ruofei (王若飞).

1907 births
1946 deaths
Chinese Communist Party politicians from Jiangsu
Victims of aviation accidents or incidents in China
Politicians from Wuxi
Republic of China politicians from Jiangsu
Members of the Politburo Standing Committee of the Chinese Communist Party
Members of the Secretariat of the Chinese Communist Party
Moscow Sun Yat-sen University alumni
General Secretaries and Chairmen of the Chinese Communist Party
Xinhua News Agency people